Verve is the fifth 12" vinyl record album by DIY home recording pioneer and one-man band R. Stevie Moore. It was released by Terry Burrows' Hamster label in the UK late 1985. Never officially reissued on compact disc, the CD-R version (copied direct from the vinyl) is available by mail from the artist.

Track listing

Side one
 "I Want You in My Life" (2:21) 
 "The Most Powerful Statement in History" (6:26) 
 "Everything" (2:56)
 "Feisty Schoolmarm" (3:03) 
 "Pledge Your Money" (2:56) 
 "Splem Jeague 3" (1:20) 
 "I'm Bored" (3:17) 
 "There Is No God in America (part 1)" (3:08)

Side two
 "There Is No God in America (part 2)" (1:40) 
 "The Crystal Chandelier" (5:30) 
 "Steve" (3:11)  
 "Defeating the Purpose" (live) (1:41) 
 "Just a Little Kid" (0:27) 
 "Curiously Enough" (excerpt)/ "Kaleidoscopics" (excerpt) (4:37) 
 "I See Star" (4:35) 
 "Who Deserves It?" (3:25)

References

External links
 RSM's Verve webpage

R. Stevie Moore albums
1985 albums
New Weird America albums